Dwight Spencer Hawley (July 2, 1896 – September 14, 1981) was an American politician in the state of Washington. He served in the Washington House of Representatives from 1950 to 1971.

References

1981 deaths
1896 births
Politicians from Bellingham, Washington
Republican Party members of the Washington House of Representatives
20th-century American politicians